Scioto Township is one of the eighteen townships of Delaware County, Ohio, United States. As of the 2010 census the population was 2,993, up from 2,527 at the 2000 census.

Geography
Located in the western part of the county, it borders the following townships:
Thompson Township - north
Radnor Township - northeast
Delaware Township - east
Concord Township - southeast
Millcreek Township, Union County - south
Dover Township, Union County - southwest
Leesburg Township, Union County - northwest

The village of Ostrander is located in southwestern Scioto Township.

Name and history
Scioto Township was formed in 1814.

It is one of five Scioto Townships statewide.

Government
The township is governed by a three-member board of trustees, who are elected in November of odd-numbered years to a four-year term beginning on the following January 1. Two are elected in the year after the presidential election and one is elected in the year before it. There is also an elected township fiscal officer, who serves a four-year term beginning on April 1 of the year after the election, which is held in November of the year before the presidential election. Vacancies in the fiscal officership or on the board of trustees are filled by the remaining trustees.

References

External links
County website

Townships in Delaware County, Ohio
Townships in Ohio